Leo Stolz (born 15 February 1991) is a German former professional footballer who played as a midfielder.

Career

Youth and college
Stolz began his career playing at SV Pullach. Soon he joined the youth system of 1860 Munich in 2004. He progressed in the youth system and became a regular starter for the club in the Under 19 Bundesliga. In 2010, he joined 1860 Munich II in the Regionalliga Süd. He made his debut for the team on 15 October 2010 in a 3–1 victory over SV Wehen Wiesbaden II. In his first season with Munich II Stolz appeared in 11 league matches as a central midfielder.

Stolz was offered a senior contract with Munich 1860 in 2011 but decided to play college soccer in the United States joining George Mason University. In his first season in the United States Stolz appeared in 18 matches and scored four goals. After a strong first season, Stolz decided to transfer to UCLA. In three years with the Bruins, Stolz played in 63 matches and scored 20 goals and recorded 22 assists. At the end of the 2014 season, Stolz was awarded the Hermann Trophy recognizing him as the top college soccer player in the country. Stolz and his UCLA team reached their first College Championship final in December 2014, but lost to Virginia on penalties.

Stolz graduated from ESADE Business School, Barcelona on 28 October 2017 successfully finishing his master's degree in international management.

New York Red Bulls 
On 15 January 2015, Stolz was selected 18th overall by New York Red Bulls in the 2015 MLS SuperDraft. Stolz dropped in the draft after he had initially stated that he would not be signing with Major League Soccer; however, he contacted New York and informed them he would sign with the club if selected by them. Stolz signed a contract with the Red Bulls on 17 January 2015.

Stolz was loaned to affiliate side New York Red Bulls II and captained the side in its first ever match on 28 March 2015 in a 0–0 draw with Rochester Rhinos. On 4 April 2015, Stolz scored his first goal for New York Red Bulls II in a 4–1 victory over Toronto FC II, the first victory in club history.

Stolz was released by Red Bulls at the end of the 2015 MLS season.

References

External links
 
 
 

1991 births
Living people
German footballers
German expatriate footballers
George Mason Patriots men's soccer players
UCLA Bruins men's soccer players
TSV 1860 Munich II players
New York Red Bulls players
New York Red Bulls II players
Association football midfielders
Expatriate soccer players in the United States
New York Red Bulls draft picks
USL Championship players
Hermann Trophy men's winners
All-American men's college soccer players
Footballers from Munich